WAFZ-FM (92.1 FM) is a radio station licensed to Immokalee, Florida, broadcasting a Regional Mexican format. The format plays a variety of new and current hits on the Regional Mexican format. At one time Also played Tejano music Music in the 1980s on its sister station WAFZ-AM. In its beginnings WAFZ had been WZOR-AM 1490 and English programming adult contemporary music and news on for the morning until 3pm. Then it changed its format to regional Mexican/tejano. The early DJs that worked there were Gabino Soliz, "EL CHAVO ALEGRE" and Irma Ayala. The station continued on the air for a long time until the mid 1990s then it went silent for a while until what is now WAFZ was bought by Glades Media and transmitted simultaneous what WAFZ FM was playing (a regional Mexican format). The Current Format of  WAFZ is a young Regional Mexican, playing newer top40 hits of the Regional Mexican Genre. At one time before this it was a country station, then it was an oldies, Christian, Spanish contemporary pop. It is  Licensed to Immokalee, Florida, United States, the station is currently owned by Glades Media Company LLC.

WAFZ's programming is also heard on WAFZ AM 1490 in Immokalee.

External links

AFZ
Radio stations established in 1987
1987 establishments in Florida